Love is the fifth compilation album by K-Ci & JoJo, released February 6, 2008. It was only released in Japan.

Track listing

References

K-Ci & JoJo albums
2008 albums